Thermoclostridium is a genus of anaerobic bacteria. Many species in Thermoclostridium were historically ordered in the genus Clostridium.

References

Oscillospiraceae
Taxa described in 2018